The Mangatewainui River is a river of the Manawatū-Whanganui region of New Zealand's North Island.

The Mangatewainui River should not be confused with its northern neighbour, the Mangatewai River.

See also
List of rivers of New Zealand

References

Rivers of Manawatū-Whanganui
Rivers of New Zealand